The Pluma porgy (Calamus pennatula) is an ocean-going fish of the family Sparidae. In many parts of the Caribbean, it is simply known as the Pluma, while in Jamaica can be called the Pimento grunt, and is sometimes called the West Indian porgy in the United States. The Pluma porgy was described by Alphone Guichenot, a French zoologist who taught, researched, and participated in specimen collecting trips on behalf of the National Natural History Museum in Paris, in 1869.

Found only in the Atlantic ocean, Pluma porgies are the most common member of their genus in the Antilles, where they are often used for food—though ciguatera poisoning has been reported as a result of this.

Description
The Pluma porgy is similar to its relative, the Jolthead porgy (C. bajonado). However, it has fewer rays on its Pectoral fins than the Jolthead. The Pluma porgy has both 12 spines and 12 soft rays on its dorsal fin, while it has only 3 spines and 10 rays on its anal fin. Their heads are somewhat steep when viewed in profile, and have poorly developed prefrontal tubercles. The Pluma porgy's overall color is silvery with purple, or lavender iridescence, individual scales have brown-yellow edges with iridescent, blue-green spots.

Distribution and habitat
Pluma porgies inhabit are found only in the western Atlantic, in a region from the Bahamas to Brazil; this includes much of the southern Caribbean and the Gulf of Mexico. They inhabit rocky areas, reefs, and also flat bottoms, where they feed on crabs, mollusks, sea worms, brittle stars and hermit crabs. The young are found in somewhat shallower water.

References

External links

Pluma porgy
Fish of the Caribbean
Taxa named by Alphonse Guichenot
Pluma porgy
Commercial fish